The fourth season of the Australian drama Sea Patrol began airing as Sea Patrol 4: The Right Stuff on 15 April 2010. Most regular cast members have returned. The season began with a major reshuffle of senior crew members, including a new Commander Maxine 'Knocker' White (Tammy McIntosh) replacing Commander Marshall (Steve Bisley), Mike Flynn being promoted to Commander, Steve Coburn (Steve Bastoni) becoming the new Lieutenant Commander, and the departure of the Navigation Officer (Nav). Other non returning cast members included Jeremy Lindsay Taylor (Buffer), whose position has been filled by Conrad Coleby (Dutchy) and Jay Ryan (Spider), replaced by Danielle Horvat (Bird). Filming began in September 2009 and the number of episodes has been extended from the usual 13 to 16.

Casting

Main cast

Recurring cast

Episodes 
{| class="wikitable plainrowheaders" width="100%" style="margin-right: 0;"
|-
! style="background-color: #002fa7; color:#ffffff;"| Seriesepisode 
! style="background-color: #002fa7; color:#ffffff;"| Seasonepisode 
! style="background-color: #002fa7; color:#ffffff;"| Title
! style="background-color: #002fa7; color:#ffffff;"| Directed by
! style="background-color: #002fa7; color:#ffffff;"| Written by
! style="background-color: #002fa7; color:#ffffff;"| Original air date
! style="background-color: #002fa7; color:#ffffff;"| Viewers(millions)

|}

See also

 List of Sea Patrol episodes

References

General references 
 
 
 
 

2010 Australian television seasons
Sea Patrol